This list of museums in Saskatchewan contains museums which are defined for this context as institutions (including nonprofit organizations, government entities, and private businesses) that collect and care for objects of cultural, artistic, scientific, or historical interest and make their collections or related exhibits available for public viewing in Saskatchewan. Also included are non-profit art galleries and university art galleries.  Museums that exist only in cyberspace (i.e., virtual museums) are not included.

Museums

Defunct museums
 Mendel Art Gallery, Saskatoon, closed in 2015 to prepare for the opening of Remai Modern in 2017
 Robsart Art Works, Robsart

See also
Nature centres in Saskatchewan

References

 Museums Association of Saskatchewan

 
Saskatchewan
Museums